Limimaricola cinnabarinus is a Gram-negative, aerobic, halotolerant and heterotrophic bacterium from the genus of Limimaricola which has been isolated from deep-sea sediments from the Shimokita Peninsula in Japan.

References 

Rhodobacteraceae
Bacteria described in 2013